Oparanthus coriaceus is a species of flowering plant in the family Asteraceae. It is found only in French Polynesia.

References

coriaceus
Flora of French Polynesia
Least concern plants
Taxonomy articles created by Polbot